Arnaudville is a town in St. Landry and St. Martin parishes in the U.S. state of Louisiana. The St. Martin Parish portion of Arnaudville is part of the Lafayette metropolitan statistical area, while the St. Landry Parish portion is part of the Opelousas–Eunice micropolitan statistical area. At the 2020 population estimates program, it had a population of 1,041.

History 
On the original site of an Attakapas Indian village, Arnaudville is one of the oldest remaining towns in St. Landry Parish. First called La Murière, it was later known as La Jonction which meant "The Junction" translated from French. By the 19th century, the town was named after the Brothers Arnaud, who had donated a large amount of land to the town to make a Church for whites and blacks (which still exists today). The Arnauds were the family in which the town got its final name from, many of whose descendants still live in the area. But the French had settled the town in the late 18th century.

Arnaudville was incorporated in 1870.

Geography 
Arnaudville is on the Bayou Teche where the Teche crosses from St. Landry Parish into St. Martin Parish. The town is called "La Jonction" by its French-speaking citizens since Arnaudville is located at the junction of Bayou Teche and Bayou Fuselier. According to the United States Census Bureau, the town has a total area of 0.7 square mile (1.9 km), all land.

Demographics 

As of the 2020 United States census, there were 1,009 people, 498 households, and 311 families residing in the town. At the 2019 American Community Survey, the racial and ethnic makeup of the town was 71.3% non-Hispanic white, 18.0% Black and African American, 2.8% some other race, and 7.9% multiracial. In 2010, its racial makeup was 90.2% White American, 7.9% African American, 0.2% American Indian and Alaska Native, 0.9% multiracial, and 0.9% Hispanic or Latin American of any race. The 2000 census determined 88.63% were White American, 10.73% African American, 0.07% American Indian and Alaska Native, 0.07% Asian, 0.50% multiracial, and 1.57% Hispanic or Latin American of any race.

In 2019, the median age was 30.3 and 7.4% of the population were under 5 years of age. Approximately 72.2% were aged 18 and older, and 11.9% aged 65 and older. Of the population over the age of 5 in 2013, 65.1% spoke English and 34.9% spoke French (including Cajun). At the 2019 census estimates, French was the second most-spoken household language.

The median income for a household in the town was $37,727, up from $21,600 at the 2000 United States census. Males had a median income of $45,417 versus $24,722 for females. About 24.4% of the population lived at or below the poverty line, down from 25.6% at the 2000 census.

Arts and culture 
Today, the town is host to the Étouffée Festival, held the 4th weekend in April, Le Feu et l'Eau—Fire and Water Rural Arts Celebration which is held in December  and Bayou Blues Revival' which is held in April. Since 2005, attracted by its quaint setting and unique culture, the town has become a haven for artists and musicians from around the world.

Saint Luc French Immersion & Cultural Campus 
The Saint Luc French Immersion & Cultural Campus  is located in Arnaudville. Led by president Mavis Frugé, the centre aims to preserve and promote Acadiana culture and Louisianian French.

The centre began in 2005 as an immersion workshop for Louisiana State University students, growing into the five-day Sur Les Deux Bayous immersion programme that partnered with several universities. In 2008, the centre began negotiations to purchase and renovate the closed Saint Luke’s hospital premises to give the centre a larger, more permanent location. In 2019, the centre officially took over ownership of the campus. Renovations, however, were temporarily delayed by the COVID-19 pandemic.

Notable people
Camille Bob, rhythm and blues singer and musician who led the dance band Lil' Bob and the Lollipops.
Don Cravins, Jr., African American Democrat who served, consecutively, in both houses of the Louisiana State Legislature
J. Minos Simon, attorney, anti-abortion activist, sportsman

Sister City
  Jausiers, France

References

External links 

 

Acadiana
Towns in St. Landry Parish, Louisiana
Towns in St. Martin Parish, Louisiana
Towns in Louisiana
Populated places established in 1870
Towns in Lafayette metropolitan area, Louisiana
1870 establishments in Louisiana